Kiai Haji Ali Ma'shum (March 2, 1915 - December 7, 1989) was the chairman of the advisory council of Nahdlatul Ulama, the world's largest Islamic organization in Indonesia, from 1980 to 1984.

References

Indonesian Islamic religious leaders
Indonesian Sunni Muslims
Javanese people
Nahdlatul Ulama
Sunni Muslim scholars of Islam
1915 births
1989 deaths